Mouriri completens is a species of plant in the family Melastomataceae. It is found in Colombia and Panama.

References

completens
Endangered plants
Flora of Colombia
Flora of Panama
Taxonomy articles created by Polbot